Middlefield is a light rail station operated by Santa Clara Valley Transportation Authority (VTA), located in Mountain View, California. This station is served by the Orange Line of the VTA Light Rail system.

Middlefield station is surrounded by an industrial area which includes some transit-oriented development on Middlefield Road between Ellis Street and Logue Avenue. Nearby offices include the headquarters for Coupons.com, MobileIron, Synopsys and Symantec Enterprise Security.

Service

Station layout

References

External links 

Santa Clara Valley Transportation Authority light rail stations
Railway stations in Mountain View, California
Railway stations in the United States opened in 1999
1999 establishments in California